The 2012 Oregon State Beavers football team represented Oregon State University during the 2012 NCAA Division I FBS football season. The team's head coach was Mike Riley, in his tenth straight season and twelfth overall. Home games were played at Reser Stadium in Corvallis, and they were members of the North Division of the Pac-12 Conference. The Beavers finished the season 9–4 and 6–3 in Pac-12 play; third place in the North Division and fourth overall. They were invited to the Alamo Bowl and were defeated by the Texas Longhorns.

Schedule

Previous season
Oregon State finished the 2011 season with a record of 3–9, 3–6 in Pac-12 play, placing 5th place in the North Division.

Game summaries

Wisconsin

UCLA

Arizona

Washington State

BYU

Utah

Washington

Arizona State

Stanford

California

Oregon

Nicholls State

On August 29, it was announced that the season opener against Nicholls State would be postponed due to the effects of Hurricane Isaac. Oregon State instead had their season opener against Wisconsin on September 8. The game was rescheduled for December 1.

Alamo Bowl

Interesting Facts
 Sean Mannion is the first sophomore captain in program history.
 The Beavers were unbeaten in September for the first time since 2000.
 The Beavers won back-to-back road games for the first time since 2009.
 Mike Riley became the winningest coach in Oregon State football history following the win against Arizona on September 29.
 The Washington State October 6 game is the earliest sellout for a game in any season since stadium expansion in 2005.
 The Beavers did not allow a touchdown in the October 6 Washington State game for the first time since the 2008 Sun Bowl.
 The Beavers did not allow a team to score in the first quarter for the first 4 games.
 Jordan Poyer intercepted three passes in the Washington State October 6 game tying for second-most in school history and is the most since 2003.
 Scott Crichton tallied three sacks in the Washington State October 6 game, becoming the first OSU player to do so since Stephen Paea in 2009.
 Crichton finished the Washington State October 6 game with four tackles for loss, tying for the third-most in a game by an Oregon State player.
 The October 14 ranking of No. 8 is the highest for the Beavers since ending 2000 at No. 4.
 The Beavers were 6–0 for the first time in 105 years, since the 1907 season.
 The sellout of the October 20 Utah game resulted in the first back-to-back home game sellout since 2008.
 The Beavers were 4–0 in the Pac-12 and haven't started that well in conference since the first year of the Pac-8 in 1968.
 The Beavers last held three consecutive opponents to single-digits at home in 1961.
 The Beavers had at least three home sellouts for the first time since the Reser Stadium expansion in 2005.
 The Beavers 62 points in the November 17 Cal game is tied for the second-most ever against a league opponent.
 Sean Mannion tied the school record for most touchdowns in a half with four in the first half of the November 17 Cal game.
 The November 24 game against Oregon broke the Reser Stadium and school attendance record set on October 6 with 47,249 attendees.
 The Beavers set a new single-game points record of 77 points.
 Oregon State finished the regular season with a 9–3 record. The six-win improvement is tied for the best in the nation with Middle Tennessee (2–9 to 8–4) and Ohio State (6–7 to 12–0). It's the biggest swing in wins in Oregon State history.
 The Beavers held four opponents under 9 points for the first time since 2000.
 The Beavers set a new school record of 42 first downs against Nicholls State, surpassing the previous record of 32 set in 1993 against Pacific. Twenty-five came via the pass, also a school record.
 The Beavers went undefeated in non-conference regular season play for the first time since 2002.
 Markus Wheaton surpassed James Rodgers and is now the Oregon State record holder for receptions in a career with 224.

Roster

Rankings

References

Oregon State
Oregon State Beavers football seasons
Oregon State Beavers football